The 1992 Mid-American Conference men's basketball tournament took place March 13–15, 1992, at Cobo Arena in Detroit, Michigan. Miami (OH) defeated , 58–57 in the championship game, to win its second MAC Tournament title, and deny the Cardinals a third straight tournament championship.

The Redskins earned an automatic bid to the 1992 NCAA tournament as #13 seed in the Southeast region. In the round of 64, Miami fell to North Carolina 68–63.

Format
Eight of nine conference members participated, with play beginning in the quarterfinal round.  was left out of the tournament field.

Bracket

References

1992
Tournament
MAC men's basketball tournament
MAC men's basketball tournament